The 1954 Kansas State Wildcats football team represented Kansas State University in the 1954 college football season.  The team's head football coach was Bill Meek, in his fourth and final year at the helm of the Wildcats.  The Wildcats played their home games in Memorial Stadium.  The Wildcats finished the season with a 7–3 record with a 3–3 record in conference play.  They finished in fifth place in the Big Seven Conference.  The Wildcats scored 191 points and gave up 154 points.  The Wildcats did not outscore their opponents again until 1969.  1954 was Kansas State's last winning season until 1970.

Schedule

References

Kansas State
Kansas State Wildcats football seasons
Kansas State Wildcats football